Henry Hill Collins Jr. (1905–1961), also known as Henry H. Collins, Jr., and Henry Collins, was an American citizen employed in the New Deal National Recovery Administration in the 1930s and later the Agricultural Adjustment Administration. He was a member of the Communist Party USA (CPUSA) and the Washington D.C. based Ware group, along with Alger Hiss, Lee Pressman, Harry Dexter White and others.  He was also a "pioneer in the compiling of ornithological field guides."

Background

Collins was born in 1905 in Philadelphia, a "scion of a Philadelphia manufacturing family" in paper products.  "My ancestors came from England to this country in 1640."  He received a BA from Princeton University and a business degree from Harvard University.

Collins was also a childhood friend of Alger Hiss in Baltimore.  He graduated from Princeton University and Harvard Business School.

Chambers also describes Collins as "my personal friend."

Government career

Initially, Collins worked in the family paper business.  He left during the Great Depression for work in the federal government during the New Deal.

In 1933, Collins worked in the National Recovery Administration. He also worked at the Agricultural Adjustment Administration and the US Department of Labor.  He also worked for the Soil Conservation Service, the US Department of Labor, and a House committee on migration.  In 1941, he joined the U.S. Small Business Committee, then a Military Affair subcommittee.

During World War II, Collins served as a captain in the Army, fought at the Battle of the Bulge, and won three ribbons and "five European campaign stars."  Immediately after the war, he worked for six months as a district official for displaced persons in Germany as part of the States Department's division of occupied territories.  Collins remained in government service until 1947.

In 1948, he was serving as executive director of the American Russian Institute in New York and living at 58 Park Avenue, New York (as testified before HUAC in 1948).

Alleged espionage activities

In August 1948, as the Hiss Case began, he appeared under subpoena before the House Un-American Activities Committee (HUAC) and would answer no questions of substance.

In 1950, Ware lived at the San Cristobal Valley Ranch near Los Alamos, New Mexico, and its atomic proving grounds.  During testimony in 1953, Collins declared, "The ranch was a perfectly legitimate business operation."

In 1952, Nathaniel Weyl confirmed under oath that Collins had been a member of the Ware Group founded by Harold Ware and inherited by Whittaker Chambers.

Subpoenaed again in 1953, he declared, "I will not be a finger man for this committee."

Personal and death

Collins married Susan B. Anthony II, great-niece of Susan B. Anthony.  He married Mary Evans Collins with whom he had two sons and one daughter.

Collins once spotted a prothonotary warbler for Alger Hiss.

Collins died age 57 on May 25, 1961, at Montefiore Hospital in the Bronx after a car crash two days earlier.

Works

In addition to books on American and Soviet government, Collins may have authored some dozen books on birds.

 America's Own Refugees; Our 4,000,000 Homeless Migrants (Princeton:  Princeton University Press, 1941)
 The Constitutions of the 16 Constituent or Union Republics of the USSR:  A Comparative Analysis (1950)
 Bent's Life Histories of North American Birds (edited) (1960)
 Bird Watchers' Guide (1961)

See also

 List of American spies
 Ware Group
 Whittaker Chambers
 Noel Field
 Harold Glasser
 John Herrmann
 Alger Hiss
 Donald Hiss
 Victor Perlo
 J. Peters
 Ward Pigman
 Lee Pressman
 Vincent Reno
 Julian Wadleigh
 Harold Ware
 Nathaniel Weyl
 Harry Dexter White
 Nathan Witt

References

External links
 
 Chambers, Whittaker, testimony before HUAC 3 August 1948
 Haynes, John Earl, and Harvey Klehr, Venona: Decoding Soviet Espionage in America, Yale University Press, 1999.  
 
 Weinstein, Allen, and Alexander Vassiliev, The Haunted Wood: Soviet Espionage in America - The Stalin Era (New York: Random House, 1999)
 Vassiliev, Alexander, "A.Gorsky's Report to Savchenko S.R., 23 December 1949", "Failures List".

1905 births
Members of the Communist Party USA
American spies for the Soviet Union
American communists
American people in the Venona papers
1961 deaths
Harvard Business School alumni
Princeton University alumni
American people of English descent
People from Philadelphia